Canley Heights is a suburb of Sydney, in the state of New South Wales, Australia 31 kilometres south-west of the Sydney central business district, in the local government area of the City of Fairfield and is part of the South-western Sydney region.

History
Canley Heights takes its name from its sister-suburb down the hill, Canley Vale. When Sir Henry Parkes settled there in the mid-19th century, he named his home Canley Grange, after his birthplace of Canley in Coventry, England.

In 1959, missionaries Carl and Lova Swart from the Church of God Reformation Movement in the United States established the first congregation of the denomination in Australia on St Johns Road in Canley Heights. The church closed shortly before the turn of the 21st century, and the building is now owned and used by another Christian church.

Commercial area
Canley Heights mostly consists of low-density residential and commercial developments.

Its commercial area is centred on Canley Vale Road, the main street in the suburb, which features convenient stores, dollar stores, as well as a variety of ethnic restaurants (generally Chinese, Vietnamese and Thai), which usually open up until late in the weekends and would offer a 'nightlife' for the residents and visitors alike, as most restaurants and shops close by 5pm in Sydney and the rest of the country.

There are also Bars hotels (with a VIP lounge and bar), bistro, hookah lounge and a Post Office, which is the only remaining banking facility, in the main street.

Education
Canley Heights Public School was established in 1955. The school has an enrolment of approximately 600 students. The school is supported by the Priority Schools Funding Program.

Transport
The nearest railway station is located in the nearby suburb of Canley Vale. The Cumberland Highway passes through Canley Heights.

Westbus operates the 817 bus route that serves the suburb.

Population
According to the 2016 census of Population, there were 10,974 residents in Canley Heights. 40.2% of people were born in Australia. The most common countries of birth were Vietnam 28.7%, Cambodia 7.1%, Iraq 2.7%, New Zealand 2.1% and China 1.7%. 20.1% of people only spoke English at home. Other languages spoken at home included Vietnamese 39.3%, Cantonese 6.7%, Khmer 6.3%, Mandarin 3.1% and Min Nan 2.9%. The most common responses for religion in Canley Heights were Buddhism 38.4%, Catholic 19.3% and No Religion 18.1%.

References

Suburbs of Sydney
City of Fairfield